Stephanie Anderson (born November 27, 1992) is an American ice hockey player, currently playing for the Minnesota Whitecaps in the Premier Hockey Federation (PHF). She previously competed for the Bemidji State Beavers women's ice hockey program and was a member of the United States women's national ice hockey team that won the gold medal at the 2015 IIHF Women's World Championship.

Playing career

High school 
Anderson competed at the high school level with the North St. Paul High School team, becoming a two-time letterwinner. In addition, she would skate for the Minnesota Thoroughbreds at the club level, eventually being appointed team captain.

NCAA hockey
Joining the Minnesota Golden Gophers in the autumn of 2011, Anderson would log her first career goal, a game-winning tally against Minnesota State on October 21, 2011. She would finish her freshman season as a member of the Gophers NCAA Frozen Four title-winning team. Opting to transfer to Bemidji State in 2012, she sat out the 2012–13 due to transfer rules within the WCHA conference. As a redshirt sophomore in 2013–14, she contributed five goals and three assists in 33 games played.

On March 7, 2015, Anderson contributed to a historic win as the Beavers defeated the Minnesota Golden Gophers by a 1–0 tally in the semifinals of the WCHA Final Face-Off. She logged the game-winning goal at the 11:46 mark of the third period. Beavers goaltender Brittni Mowat made 37 saves, registering her seventh shutout of the season, a new program record. In addition, it marked the first time that the Beavers advanced to the championship game of the WCHA Final Face-Off.

CWHL 

In 2017, Anderson signed her first professional contract with Kunlun Red Star of the CWHL. She would put up 25 points in 53 games across two seasons, before the league folded.

NWHL
Anderson signed with the NWHL Minnesota Whitecaps for its 2019–2020 season. She put up 10 points in 22 games in the 2019–20 season.

International 
In 2009, she made her debut for USA Hockey, competing in a three-game exhibition series between the Canadian and US Under-18 rosters. In 2015, she was a member of the gold medal-winning team at the IIHF World Championships

Career stats

USA Hockey

NCAA

Awards and honors
 2008, All-Classic Suburban Conference

References

External links
 
 Stephanie Anderson at USA Hockey
 Stephanie Anderson at BSU Beavers
 Stephanie Anderson at Minnesota Gophers

1992 births
Living people
American expatriate ice hockey players in China
American ice hockey left wingers
American women's ice hockey forwards
Bemidji State Beavers women's ice hockey players
Ice hockey players from Minnesota
Minnesota Golden Gophers women's ice hockey players
Minnesota Whitecaps players
People from North St. Paul, Minnesota
Premier Hockey Federation players
Shenzhen KRS Vanke Rays players